The International Tai Chi Chuan Association (ITCCA) was founded in the 1970s (probably 1973) by Master Chu King Hung and Master Yang Shou Chung (Master Chu used the name ITCCA as early as 1974). Its purpose is the dissemination of the family-style Yang-style Tai Chi Chuan. There are branches of this organisation in several European countries: Austria, Belgium, Denmark, Finland, France, Germany, Greece, Hungary, Italy, Netherlands, Norway, Portugal, Sweden and Switzerland.

References

External links 
Website of the ITCCA
Website of the ITCCA Belgium
Website of the ITCCA Finland
Website of the ITCCA in the Netherlands
Website of the ITCCA in Switzerland - branch Kathrin Rutishauser
Website of the ITCCA in Switzerland – branch of Geneva
Website of the Austrian branch Tai Chi Vienna
Website of the Austrian branch Tai Chi Innsbruck
Website of the ITCCA in Italy

International sports organizations
Chinese martial arts
International organisations based in Germany
Sports organizations established in 1973